Lotta Kaarina Kemppinen (born 1 April 1998) is a Finnish sprinter. She won the silver medal in the women's 60 metres at the 2021 European Athletics Indoor Championships held in Toruń, Poland.

International competitions

References

External links 

 
 

Living people
1998 births
Athletes from Helsinki
Finnish female sprinters
Finnish Athletics Championships winners
20th-century Finnish women
21st-century Finnish women